Buergeria otai is a species of frogs in the family Rhacophoridae. It is endemic to Taiwan and found in the eastern and southern parts of the island. Buergeria japonica, with whom Buergeria otai was confused before described as a distinct species in 2017, occurs in northwestern Taiwan. The two species have only a narrow contact zone and can be distinguished based on genetic markers, calls, and morphology.

Etymology
The specific name otai honours professor Hidetoshi Ota, in recognition of his "great contribution to herpetology and biogeography in East Asia". Common name Ota's stream tree frog has been suggested for this species.

Description
Adult males measure  and adult females  in snout–vent length. The body is elongated and moderately slender. The tympanum is barely discernible, whereas the supratympanic fold is prominent. Males have comparatively large subgular vocal sac. The fingers are slender, without webbing, and bear medium-sized discs. The toes are long, partially webbed, and also bear medium-sized discs. Dorsal coloration is variable, depending on light conditions and the background. During daytime, resting frogs are usually grayish. Calling males at night show a range of colors, from gray, yellow, gold, light brown, to dark orange. There is a dark dorsal marking resembling letter X or H that may almost fade away. Females usually turn brownish during amplexus. The chin and the belly are gray-white. The chin has small irregular mottling and there are tiny white spots on the ventral side of the thighs.

Buergeria otai can emit two types of calls, "short calls" consisting of regular, long and lasting consecutive pulses (usually about 16–17), and "long calls" that have a major peak at the beginning, a serial of vary rapid pulses, and usually an ending with another short peak. The former call is similar to the call of Buergeria japonica, whereas the latter is unique.

Habitat and conservation
Buergeria otai is associated with streams at elevations below . They are primarily found in small ditches or shallow waters near the streams, rather than in the major river course. Reproduction can take place year round, but peak breeding occurs in April to July. The tadpoles are benthic herbivores or detritivores and live in shallow waters. Similarly to Buergeria japonica, this species has tolerance to high temperatures found in hot springs. The tadpoles may even seek high temperatures. Whether this species also shares the salt tolerance of Buergeria japonica is unknown.

Wang and colleagues suggest that Buergeria otai  might the most abundant rhacophorid in Taiwan; there are huge populations especially in the eastern part of Taiwan. As of late 2017, the International Union for Conservation of Nature (IUCN) has not yet assessed this species.

References

otai
Endemic fauna of Taiwan
Amphibians of Taiwan
Frogs of Asia
Amphibians described in 2017